The Thomas H. Thompson House, also known as Wayside Manor, is a historic home located at Brownsville, Fayette County, Pennsylvania.  It was  built in 1906, and is a -story brick dwelling with Spanish Colonial Revival style design details.  It has a hipped roof clad with red Spanish tile, dormers on three sides of the roof, a full width front porch, and carved stone detailing.  Also on the property is a two-story, hipped roof carriage house built in 1917–1918.

It was added to the National Register of Historic Places in 1995.

References

Houses on the National Register of Historic Places in Pennsylvania
Houses completed in 1906
Spanish Colonial Revival architecture in the United States
Houses in Fayette County, Pennsylvania
National Register of Historic Places in Fayette County, Pennsylvania
1906 establishments in Pennsylvania